The women's 100 metre freestyle competition at the 2014 South American Games took place on March 8 at the Estadio Nacional.  The last champion was Arlene Semeco of Venezuela.

This race consisted of two lengths of the pool, both lengths being in freestyle.

Records
Prior to this competition, the existing world and Pan Pacific records were as follows:

Results
All times are in minutes and seconds.

Heats
The first round was held on March 8, at 11:16.

Final 
The final was held on March 8, at 19:38.

References

Swimming at the 2014 South American Games